Five Below Inc. (stylized as fiVe BEL°W) is an American chain of specialty discount stores that sells products that are less than $5, plus a small assortment of products from $6 to $25. Founded by Tom Vellios and David Schlessinger and headquartered in Philadelphia, Pennsylvania, the chain is aimed at tweens and teens. There are over 1,100 stores located across the United States.

History
David Schlessinger, founder of Encore Books and Zany Brainy, and Tom Vellios, former CEO of Zany Brainy, founded Five Below on October 4, 2002 in Wayne, Pennsylvania.

On March 18, 2020, Five Below announced the temporary closing of all stores due to the COVID-19 outbreak. However, as of May 29, 2020, 75% of Five Below stores across the United States reopened with plans for new stores to open up.

Growth and expansion
To date, Five Below operates over 1,100 stores in 40 states, employing over 90,000 associates along with two distribution centers.  It began its outward expansion away from the Philadelphia Metro area by entering additional out-of-state markets: Illinois and Michigan in 2011; Georgia, Kansas, Missouri, and Western Michigan in 2012; Texas in 2013; Tennessee in 2014; Alabama, Florida, and Kentucky in 2015; Louisiana, Minnesota, Oklahoma, West Virginia, and Wisconsin in 2016; California in 2017; and Arkansas in 2018. Five Below in 2019 publicly stated that they could build as many as 2,500 U.S. stores in the future. Arizona, Iowa, and Nebraska were introduced that year. Colorado and Nevada were added in 2020; New Mexico and Utah in 2021. Both Dakotas had opened new stores in 2022. Oregon and Washington are to open later.

In September 2014, the company announced a new lease agreement to move its New Castle, Delaware, distribution center to Oldmans Township, New Jersey. The new center would add 275 jobs to the local economy while Delaware would lose 175.

On July 19, 2012, Five Below went public on the NASDAQ at the share price of $17. In 2014, Joel Anderson was appointed CEO. 2016 sales hit $1,000 million, 2017 sales hit $1,300 million and 2018 sales hit $1,560 million.

Store format 
The store specializes mainly in carrying a wide variety of merchandise at a low price.

Corporate affairs

Headquarters 
In 2018, Five Below moved its corporate headquarters, now called WowTown, to the Lit Brothers Building in the Market East section of Philadelphia, PA, and has rights to more than 200,000 square feet. WowTown has over 300 employees.

Philanthropy 

Since 2005, Five Below has contributed over $19 million for organizations around the country who focus on the well-being of children. They have partnered with and supported Alex's Lemonade Stand Foundation with the sale of lemonade bracelets, gift cards and pin-ups.

Since 2008, Five Below has participated in the annual Halloween Promotion benefiting St. Jude Children's Research Hospital.

After Hurricane Sandy, Five Below partnered with the American Red Cross and collected over $50,000 through a $1 donation at the register program. The company then doubled all donations resulting in a donation in the total of $100,000.

In 2018, Five Below became an official Toys for Tots sponsor.

References

Press releases

External links

 Five Below Website

2002 establishments in Pennsylvania
Companies based in Philadelphia
American companies established in 2002
Retail companies established in 2002
Discount stores of the United States
Toy retailers of the United States
Variety stores
Companies listed on the Nasdaq
2012 initial public offerings
Company articles with out of date infobox information